The County Fair is a 1932 American pre-Code drama film directed by Louis King and starring Hobart Bosworth, Marion Shilling and Ralph Ince. A Kentucky Colonel and a former jockey manage to defeat a gang of criminals who hope to rig a horse race.

Cast
 Hobart Bosworth as Col. Ainsworth 
 Marion Shilling as Alice Ainsworth 
 Ralph Ince as Diamond Barnett  
 William Collier Jr. as Jimmie Dolan 
 Fred 'Snowflake' Toones as Curfew 
 George Chesebro as Gunner 
 Otto Hoffman as Specs Matthews 
 Arthur Millett as Hank Bradley 
 Eddie Kane as Fisher

Remakes
The film was remade twice, on both occasions by the same studio Monogram:
 County Fair (1937)
 County Fair (1950)

References

Bibliography

 Langman, Larry & Ebner, David. Hollywood's Image of the South: A Century of Southern Films. Greenwood Publishing, 2001.

External links

1932 films
1930s sports drama films
American black-and-white films
American sports drama films
1930s English-language films
Films directed by Louis King
American horse racing films
Monogram Pictures films
1932 drama films
1930s American films